Diethoxyethane may refer to:

 1,1-Diethoxyethane
  (ethylene glycol diethyl ether)